Arizona's 7th Legislative District is one of 30 in the state, covering portions of Coconino, Gila, Navajo, and Pinal counties. As of November 2022, there are 95 precincts in the district: 25 in Coconino, 36 in Gila, 7 in Navajo, and 27 in Pinal, with 154,574 active registered voters. According to the 2020 Census, the population of LD 7 is 240,214.

Political representation
The district is represented for the 2023 – 2024 Legislative Session in the State Senate By Republican Wendy Rogers and in the House of Representatives by Republicans David Cook and David Marshall.

See also
 List of Arizona Legislative Districts
 Arizona State Legislature

References

Coconino County, Arizona
Navajo County, Arizona
Pinal County, Arizona
Gila County, Arizona
Arizona legislative districts